is a passenger railway station located in the town of Ogawa, Saitama, Japan, operated by the private railway operator Tōbu Railway.

Lines
There are no direct trains to or from Ikebukuro.

Station layout
The station consists of an island platform serving two tracks. The station building is located on the east side, and an entrance on the west side of the station leads to the east side entrance via a passageway underneath the tracks.

Platforms

Adjacent stations

History
The station opened on 23 July 1932 as Takezawa Station. It was renamed Tōbu-Takezawa Station on 1 July 1934 to differentiate it from Takezawa Station, which opened on the Japanese National Railways (now JR East) Hachikō Line in October 1934.

From 17 March 2012, station numbering was introduced on the Tōbu Tōjō  Line, with Tōbu-Takezawa Station becoming "TJ-34".

Passenger statistics
In fiscal 2019, the station was used by an average of 877 passengers daily.

Surrounding area

 Takezawa Station (JR Hachiko Line) (approximately 500 m away)
 
 Takezawa Elementary School
 Tōbu-Takezawa Ekimae Post Office

See also
 List of railway stations in Japan

References

External links

  

Railway stations in Saitama Prefecture
Stations of Tobu Railway
Tobu Tojo Main Line
Railway stations in Japan opened in 1932
Ogawa, Saitama